Henrique I Nerika a Mpudi was ruler of the Kingdom of Kongo from 1567 to 1568 and the last from the Lukeni kanda dynasty. Like his predecessor Bernardo I, Henrique died while on campaign at the frontiers of the kingdom. He was killed while fighting the BaTeke of the Anziku Kingdom.

References

See also
List of rulers of Kongo
Kingdom of Kongo
Anziku Kingdom

Manikongo of Kongo
1568 deaths
16th-century monarchs in Africa
Military personnel killed in action
Year of birth unknown